Morris Mandel (1911–2009)  was an American educator and journalist.

Biography
Morris Mandel was born in 1911 in Lublin, Poland. His family moved to the United States when he was three. His son Allen Mandel, is a rabbi. Mandel wrote advice columns for The Jewish Press, "Human Emotions" and "Youth Speaks Up,"  for close to five decades. He was English principal of Yeshiva Toras Emes; a guidance counselor in the New York City public school system; taught law and accounting; ran a singles group that produced many marriages, headed summer camps  in the 1940s and 50s; lectured in the United States,  Canada, and Israel; and wrote close to 50 books and raised funds for several Jewish causes.

Journalistic career
Mandel addressed different audiences with different messages. His "Problems in Human Emotions" column sometimes said the seemingly obvious ("Even the darkest hour only has 60 minutes" ), but in a way that found him being authoritatively cited

References

American advice columnists
American people of Polish-Jewish descent
Jewish advice columnists
Congress Poland emigrants to the United States
1911 births
2009 deaths